Melete lycimnia, the common melwhite, primrose flag or lycimnia white flag, is a butterfly in the family Pieridae. It is found from Texas in the United States to Bolivia. The habitat consists of lowland rainforests.

The appearance of the adults depends on the subspecies and ranges from a white ground colour, narrow black borders, and a yellow spot at the base of the hindwings (M. l. peruviana) to primrose yellow, with wide brown borders (M. l. lycimnia). In all subspecies, females are more yellowish.

The larvae probably feed on Loranthaceae species.

Subspecies
The following subspecies are recognised:
M. l. lycimnia (Suriname)
M. l. flippantha (Fabricius, 1793) (Brazil: Rio de Janeiro, Espírito Santo, Minas Gerais)
M. l. isandra (Boisduval, 1836) (Mexico, Honduras, Costa Rica)
M. l. peruviana (Lucas, 1852) (Peru, Bolivia, Brazil: Amazonas)
M. l. aelia (C. & R. Felder, 1861) (Ecuador, Colombia, Peru, Bolivia)
M. l. eurymnia (C. & R. Felder, 1865) (Colombia)
M. l. monstrosa (Butler, 1875) (Panama)
M. l. chagris (Staudinger, 1876) (Panama)
M. l. harti (Butler, 1896) (Trinidad)
M. l. latilimbata (Butler, 1896) (Ecuador)
M. l. petronia Fruhstorfer, 1907 (Brazil: Santa Catarina, Rio Grande do Sul)
M. l. phazania Fruhstorfer, 1907 (Brazil: Bahia)
M. l. theodori Fruhstorfer, 1907 (Brazil: Amazonas)
M. l. paulista Fruhstorfer, 1908 (Brazil: São Paulo)
M. l. napona (Röber, 1909) (Ecuador, Peru)
M. l. narmia Fruhstorfer, 1910 (Brazil: Mato Grosso)

References

Pierini
Butterflies described in 1777
Fauna of Brazil
Pieridae of South America
Taxa named by Pieter Cramer